Gilbert Prouteau (14 June 1917 – 2 August 2012) was a French poet and film director. He was born in Nesmy, Vendée. In 1948 he won a bronze medal in the art competitions of the Olympic Games for his "Rythme du Stade" ("Rhythm of the Stadium"). At the beginning of the 1990s he was, with Jean-Pierre Thiollet, one of the writers contributing to the French magazine L'Amateur d'Art.

Selected works

 Rythme du Stade, Lugdunum, 1942 (poems)
 La part du vent, Ariane, 1947 (poems)
 Anthologie des textes sportifs de la littérature, Défense de la France, 1948
 Saison blanche, Amiot Dumont, 1951
 Le Sexe des Anges, Grasset, 1952
 La peur des femmes, Grasset, 1959
 Immortelle Vendée, Les productions de Paris, 1959
 Retour aux sources, Editions Hérault, 1960
 Les Dieux meurent le matin, Grasset, 1962 (A collection relating the tragic deaths of ten poets).
 Le machin, La Table Ronde, 1965
 Tout est dans la fin, Robert Laffont, 1971
 Comme un vol de corbeaux, La Table Ronde, 1977
 Le Dernier Défi de Georges Clemenceau, France Empire, 1979
 Le grand roman de Jules Verne: sa vie, Stock, 1979
 Sept morts d'amour, Hachette, 1981
 Les miroirs de la perversité, Albin Michel, 1984
 La Nuit de l'île d'Aix ou le Crépuscule d'un dieu, Albin Michel, 1985
 Gilles de Rais ou la Gueule du loup, Editions du Rocher, 1992
 La bataille de Cholet ou la guerre en sabots, Editions du Rocher, 1993
 Le fabuleux secret de l'alchimiste : Nicolas Flamel prophète ou imposteur, Bartillat, 1994
 Je te dis qu’il faut vivre, Editions Hérault, 1998
 Monsieur l'instituteur, Albin Michel, 2000
 Victor Hugo vendéen, Mosée, 2002
 Les Soleils de minuit, Editions Hérault, 2003
 Rabelais en Vendée, D'Orbestier, 2004
 Les Orgues d’Hélène, Écho Optique, 2007 (poems)
 Le Roman de la Vendée, Geste, 2010
 Les mots de passe, Editions du Petit Pavé, 2013

Filmography

 La Vie passionnée de Georges Clemenceau (1953)
 Dieu a choisi Paris (1969), with Jean-Paul Belmondo

Further reading
 Chastagnol, Jean, ed. (1980). Le Roman d'un rebelle, Gilbert Prouteau. Paris: Diffusion De Vecchi. .

References

External links
Profile

1917 births
2012 deaths
People from Vendée
Olympic bronze medalists in art competitions
French male poets
20th-century French poets
French directors
Winners of the Prix Broquette-Gonin (literature)
Prix Sainte-Beuve winners
Medalists at the 1948 Summer Olympics
20th-century French male writers
Olympic competitors in art competitions